Kanufi (Anib) is a Plateau language of Nigeria.

References

Ninzic languages
Languages of Nigeria